Calatafimi was a torpedo cruiser of the  built for the Italian Regia Marina (Royal Navy) in the 1880s. She was built by the Cantiere navale fratelli Orlando shipyard; her keel was laid in July 1891, she was launched in May 1894, and was commissioned in December 1895. Her main armament were her five torpedo tubes, which were supported by a battery of eleven small-caliber guns. Calatafimi spent most of her career in the main Italian fleet, where she was primarily occupied with training exercises. The ship was sold in March 1907 and broken up for scrap.

Design

The Partenope-class cruisers were derivatives of the earlier, experimental s, themselves based on the preceding cruiser . The doctrine emphasized the use of small, torpedo-armed craft to destroy expensive ironclads.

She displaced  normally. The ship had a short forecastle deck that terminated at the conning tower. She had a crew of between 96 and 121 personnel.

Her propulsion system consisted of a pair of horizontal triple-expansion steam engines, each driving a single screw propeller. Steam was supplied by four coal-fired locomotive boilers, which were vented through two widely spaced funnels.

Calatafimi was armed with a main battery of one  /40 gun placed on the forecastle. Close-range defense against torpedo boats was provided by a secondary battery of six  /43 guns mounted singly. She was also equipped with three  /20 guns in single mounts. Her primary offensive weapon was her six  torpedo tubes.

Service history
The new cruiser was originally to have been named Tersicore, but she was renamed Calatafimi the day construction began. The last member of her class, Calatafimi was laid down on 15 September 1891 at the Regio Cantiere di Castellammare di Stabia (Royal Dockyard in Castellammare di Stabia), and was launched on 18 March 1893. After fitting-out work was completed, the ship was commissioned into the fleet on 16 January 1894. The following year, she was assigned to the 2nd Division of the Permanent Squadron, which included her sister ship , the ironclad battleship , and the protected cruiser . The Squadron was based at La Spezia at the time, though Calatafimi was stationed primarily in Taranto and Naples, along with most of the other torpedo cruisers of the Italian fleet.

In 1895, unrest in the Ottoman Empire that killed hundreds of foreign nationals prompted several of the European great powers to send an international fleet to pressure the Ottomans into compensating the victims. This second squadron was stocked with coal and ammunition in the event that it would need to reinforce the squadron at Smryna.

In 1896, she took part in the annual summer maneuvers in July as part of the First Division of the Reserve Squadron, which also included the ironclads  and Lepanto and the protected cruiser . In 1898, Calatafimi was assigned to the Reserve Squadron, which included the ironclads Lepanto, Francesco Morosini, and Ruggiero di Lauria, three protected cruisers, and the torpedo cruiser . The following year, she returned to the Active Squadron, where she served with six ironclads, the armored cruiser , the protected cruiser Lombardia, and Goito. The ship was sold for scrap in March 1907 and subsequently broken up.

Footnotes

Notes

Citations

References

External links
 Calatafimi Marina Militare website

Partenope-class cruisers
Ships built in Castellammare di Stabia